The Act 53 Geo 3 c 160, sometimes called the Doctrine of the Trinity Act 1813, the Trinitarian Act 1812, the Unitarian Relief Act, the Trinity Act, the Unitarian Toleration Bill, or Mr William Smith's Bill (after Whig politician William Smith), was an Act of the Parliament of the United Kingdom which amended its blasphemy laws and granted toleration for Unitarian worship.

 Section 1 amended the Toleration Act 1689 (passed by the Parliament of England) to include non-Trinitarians among the Protestant dissenters whose practices would be tolerated.
 Section 2 repealed the provision of the Blasphemy Act 1697 (also English) which imposed  civil penalties on anyone professed or educated as a Christian who denied the Trinity.
 Section 3 repealed two Acts of the Scottish Parliament which made blasphemy punishable by death: the Act against Blasphemy 1661 and Act against Blasphemy 1695.

The Dissenters (Ireland) Act 1817 (57 Geo 3 c 70) extended the Doctrine of the Trinity Act 1813 to Ireland, and amended the Prohibition of Disturbance of Worship Act 1719 (passed by the Parliament of Ireland) in the same way as the 1813 Act had amended the 1689 Act.

The Doctrine of the Trinity Act 1813 was repealed by the Statute Law Revision Act 1873.

Notes

Further reading
Archibald John Stephens. The Statutes Relating to the Ecclesiastical and Eleemosynary Institutions of England, Wales, Ireland, India, and the Colonies. 1845. Volume 1. Pages 1066 and 1067.
John Shortt. The Law Relating to Works of Literature and Art. Second Edition. 1884. Pages 368 and 369.

United Kingdom Acts of Parliament 1813
Islam in the United Kingdom
1813 in Christianity
Trinitarianism
History of religion in the United Kingdom
Christianity and law in the 19th century
Repealed United Kingdom Acts of Parliament
Law about religion in the United Kingdom
Unitarianism in the United Kingdom
Capital punishment in the United Kingdom
Church of Scotland